Symmoca achrestella is a moth of the family Autostichidae. It is found in Austria and Italy.

The wingspan is 20–22 mm. The forewings have a greyish ground colour.

References

External links
Images representing Symmoca achrestella at Consortium for the Barcode of Life

Moths described in 1889
Symmoca
Moths of Europe